NGC 453 is a triple star located in the constellation Pisces. It was discovered in 1881 by Édouard Stephan.

References

External links 

Pisces (constellation)
0453
Triple stars